José César Nava Vázquez (born 16 July 1974) is a Mexican lawyer and politician from the National Action Party. He has served as Deputy of the LVIII and LXI Legislatures of the Mexican Congress representing the Federal District.

From 2009 to 2010 he served as President of the National Action Party.

References

1974 births
Living people
Politicians from Michoacán
People from Morelia
21st-century Mexican lawyers
National Action Party (Mexico) politicians
21st-century Mexican politicians
Panamerican University alumni
Harvard University alumni
Deputies of the LXI Legislature of Mexico
Members of the Chamber of Deputies (Mexico) for Mexico City